Bachir Ben Mohamed Abdelouahab (December 2, 1897, Miliana - 1978, Algiers) was an Algerian politician and medical doctor. He practiced medicine in Blida, Zaouia street since March 1924, where he was elected municipal councillor and general councillor. He was a member of the pro-French Muslim Party for Progress (PMPRO). In 1945, he was elected to the French Constituent Assembly, from the Muslim non-citizens constituency of the Algiers department. He was one three candidates on the list of the Union for Social Progress elected from Algiers.

In the Constituent Assembly he was included in the Interior, Algeria and General, Department and Municipal Administration Commission and in the Family, Population and Public Health Commission. He voted in favour of the Félix Gouin ministry formed on January 29, 1946. Aware of contradictions within the Muslim community, he resigned from the Constituent Assembly on February 19, 1946. His seat was filled by Abderahmane Fares, who had been the fourth candidate on the list of the Union for Social Progress.

References

1897 births
1978 deaths
People from Miliana
People of French Algeria
Union and Social Progress List politicians
Members of the Constituent Assembly of France (1945)
Algerian physicians
20th-century physicians